Alien: Isolation – The Digital Series (also known simply as Alien: Isolation) is an American adult animated science fiction horror streaming television series directed by Fabien Dubois, based on the Alien franchise created by Dan O'Bannon and Ronald Shusett, and the 2014 video game of the same name by Alistair Hope, that premiered on February 28, 2019, on IGN. The series was created by Kinga Smith and Fabien Dubois and stars much of the cast of the video game. It takes place 15 years after the events of the 1979 Alien film and follows Amanda Ripley, daughter of Alien protagonist Ellen Ripley, as she investigates the disappearance of her mother.

Premise
Alien: Isolation takes place 15 years after the original film and follows Amanda Ripley, daughter of Ellen Ripley, as she accompanies a Weyland-Yutani team being sent to retrieve the flight recorder of her mother's ship, the Nostromo, recently located by the crew of a salvage vessel Anesidora and being held aboard the Seegson corporation remote Sevastopol space station in orbit around the KG-348 gas giant, on request of Christopher Samuels, an android working for the Weyland-Yutani corporation, so that Ripley can have closure regarding the fate of her missing mother. Ripley, Samuels, and Weyland-Yutani executive Nina Taylor travel to Sevastopol on board the Torrens courier ship, only to find the station damaged and its communications offline. After attempting to spacewalk over to the station to investigate, their EVA line is severed by debris, and Ripley is separated from the others and forced to enter the station on her own, encountering hostile androids, humans, and an unknown alien organism.

Cast and characters

Main

 Andrea Deck as Amanda Ripley / Ellen Ripley (episodes 6 & 7)
 Kezia Burrows provided the motion capture and likeness for Amanda Ripley.
 Anthony Howell as Christopher Samuels
 Emerald O'Hanrahan as Nina Taylor
 Sean Gilder as Henry Marlow

Recurring

 Richie Campbell as Ricardo 
 Syrus Lowe provided the motion capture and likeness for Ricardo.
 William Hope as Marshal Waits

Guest

 Jane Perry as Diane Verlaine (episode 1)
 George Anton as Axel (episode 2)
 Melanie Gutteridge as Catherine Foster (episode 4)

Episodes
{{Episode table |background=#FE8118 |overall=3 |title=17 |director=23 |writer=42 |airdate=15 |released=y |episodes= 

{{Episode list
 |EpisodeNumber   = 3
 |Title           = Episode 3
 |DirectedBy      = Fabien Dubois
 |WrittenBy       = Jeff Juhasz
 |OriginalAirDate = 
 |ShortSummary    = Sevastopol'''s mystery killer hunts Amanda as she searches for her missing companions.
 |LineColor       = FE8118
}}

{{Episode list
 |EpisodeNumber   = 5
 |Title           = Episode 5
 |DirectedBy      = Fabien Dubois
 |WrittenBy       = Jeff Juhasz
 |OriginalAirDate = 
 |ShortSummary    = Amanda discovers that Sevastopol's android caretakers have an agenda of their own, and powerful outside forces have put everyone's lives in danger.
 |LineColor       = FE8118
}}

}}

Production
Development
On February 13, 2019, Bloody Disgusting reported that two Alien television series were in development, one animated, one live-action. On February 20, 2019, Axis Animation reported that a seven-episode animated adaption of the 2014 video game Alien: Isolation was in development. On February 27, 2019, it was announced that IGN had given the production of Alien: Isolation – The Digital Series a series order to consist of seven quarter hour episodes, each consisting of a combination of cut scenes from the game, newly rendered scenes, and first-person segments in the game that were re-shot and edited for the purposes of the streaming television series, to be exclusively released on IGN the following day. The series was set to be written by Jeff Juhasz and produced by Reverse Engineering Studios (RES) and DVgroup.

Casting
Alongside the initial series announcement, it was reported that the cast of the original Alien: Isolation'' game would reprise their characters for the series, including Andrea Deck as Amanda and Ellen Ripley.

Release

Marketing
On February 27, 2019, the official trailer was released which included the announcement that the show would premiere on February 28, 2019.

References

External links

 
 

Alien (franchise) mass media
2019 American television series debuts
2010s American adult animated television series
2010s American horror television series
American adult computer-animated television series
American thriller television series
Coming-of-age television shows
English-language television shows
Midlife crisis in television
IGN
American adult animated web series
American adult animated horror television series
American animated science fiction television series
Animated television series about extraterrestrial life
Interquel television series
Television series set in outer space